"Caller Herrin is a Scottish song, the music by Nathaniel Gow (1763–1831), and the words by Carolina Nairne (1766–1845).

History

[[File:Sir John Everett Millais - Caller Herrin', 1881.jpg|thumb|Sir John Everett Millais: Caller Herrin''', 1881]]
"Caller herrin means fresh herring. It was the traditional cry of Newhaven fishwives, who carried in creels freshly caught herring which they sold from door to door.
Gow, a violinist and bandleader of Edinburgh, incorporated this cry, and also the bells of St Andrew's Church, into his composition, written about 1798. It became one of his best-known tunes.Nathaniel Gow (1763-1831) regencydances.org, accessed 17 June 2016.

Carolina Oliphant, Lady Nairne, was a songwriter, using the pseudonym "Mrs Bogan of Bogan". Attending balls in country houses of Perthshire, she heard the music of Nathaniel Gow, and wrote words for "Caller Herrin.

It has been adapted many times. Philip Knapton composed a set of variations of the tune, for piano or harp, which appeared in 1820 and became popular. Joseph Binns Hart (1794–1844) arranged the tune as a quadrille in his 8th Set of Scotch Quadrilles (1827).The Life & Quadrilles of Joseph Binns Hart (1794-1844) regencydances.org, accessed 17 June 2016.

Music
The tune and words of the chorus:

In literature
 In The Ascent of Rum Doodle'' by W. E. Bowman, Constant the Linguist gives a "passionate rendering" of Caller Herrin' to Travis the Seal with devastating results.

References

External links
 Caller Herring tunearch.com
 Traditional Scottish Songs - Caller Herrin' - Lyrics rampantscotland.com
  Jean Redpath. Will ye no come back again?  The Songs of Lady Nairne

Scottish songs
History of Edinburgh
History of fishing